Nebraska Highway 43 (N-43) is a highway in southeastern Nebraska. Its southern terminus is near Adams at an intersection with N-41. Its northern terminus is at an intersection with U.S. Highway 34 (US 34) in Eagle.

Route description
Nebraska Highway 43 begins near Adams at an intersection with N-41.  The highway heads due north into farmland until Bennet.  Shortly after Bennet, the highway meets N-2.  N-2 and N-43 overlap until Palmyra, which is where N-43 turns north.  N-43 goes north for four miles (6 km), west for one, and then north for three more miles, where it meets US 34 in Eagle and ends.

Major intersections

References

External links

The Nebraska Highways Page: Highways 31 to 60
Nebraska Roads: NE 41-60

043
Transportation in Gage County, Nebraska
Transportation in Lancaster County, Nebraska
Transportation in Otoe County, Nebraska
Transportation in Cass County, Nebraska